The Menard Limestone is a geologic formation in the Illinois Basin of southern Illinois, southwestern Indiana, and western Kentucky.

The type section of both the Walche Limestone Member and the Scottsburg Limestone Member are exposures in Walche's Cut, a railway cutting on the  Illinois Central Railroad.

References

Geology of Indiana